The General Commission for Audiovisual Media  (GCAM) is a government organization in Saudi Arabia. It was founded in 2012, and is responsible for the development, regulation, and supervision of audio-visual media transmission and content within the country. GCAM reports to the Ministry of Media and is independent in terms of finance and administration. Esra Assery is currently appointed as CEO of the General Commission for Audiovisual Media.

History 
The General Commission for Audiovisual Media was founded following decision no. #236 of the Council of Ministers on 21 Rajab 1433 AH (11 June 2012). In Shawwal 1433 AH (September 2012), the organisation of GCAM was approved, which includes having a board of directors headed by the Minister of Culture and Information (or presently the Minister of Media as of 2018).

Responsibilities 
GCAM conducts and regulation and policies audiovisual activities in accordance with Kingdom’s “media policy” as well as provides related services to facilitates the content broadcasting.  furthermore, it issues and manages licenses for audiovisual media transmission and content. GCAM is also responsible for technical issues and specifications related to the media such as providing the approval for the frequency spectrum, media transmission devices.

Saudi cinema 
In December 2017, The General Commission of Audiovisual Media chaired by Ministry of Culture and Information (currently Ministry of Media) announced the re-opening the cinema in the Kingdom where the commission would be responsible for granting licenses to cinemas.

Saudi Arabian age rating systems

Video games 
In August 2016, GCAM introduced Saudi Arabia's official age rating system for video games. This came following two years of research, and working closely with Sony MEA's Saudi office, whom handles the PlayStation brand in the country. The first game title released under GCAM's rating is Uncharted 4: A Thief's End. Any game is effectively banned if GCAM refuses to rate it. The ratings include the following:

Films 
Following the December 2017 announcement of film theatres re-opening in Saudi Arabia, in early 2018 Deadline Hollywood reported that the Center for International Communication (CIC) started developing a new content classification system for films to be exhibited in the country. By April 2018, GCAM has officially approved of a 6-category film content classification system. In June 2022, the system was silently revised with an additional "PG15" category.

Any film is refused classification (effectively banned) if said film does not pass GCAM's censorship standards, unless edited by the film's local or global distributor if possible. Theatres are obligated to refuse admittance to any minor under minimal age from viewing films rated R12 or higher. As of June 2022, the ratings include the following:

References

External links 
 



Government agencies established in 2012
2012 establishments in Saudi Arabia
Censorship in Saudi Arabia
Cinema of Saudi Arabia
Entertainment rating organizations
Government agencies of Saudi Arabia
Motion picture rating systems
Video game content ratings systems
Video game organizations